The following list is the list of mayors of Mersin, Turkey after the proclamation of Turkish republic.

The mayors

References

Mersin
History of Mersin Province